Alan Emanuel Aciar (born 26 February 1988) is an Argentine professional footballer who plays as a defender who plays for Independiente Chivilcoy.

Career
Acair played for the U17 team of Racing, before he went to Turkey and then Croatia. He then returned to Argentina and was without club for six months before joining San Lorenzo. He then resigned and went to Germany to a club named Fortuna in the third division in the country.

On 14 January 2020, Dominican club Cibao FC confirmed the signing of Aciar. In 2021, Acair returned to Independiente Chivilcoy.

References

External links 
 
 Alan Aciar at BDFA

1988 births
Living people
Footballers from Buenos Aires
Association football defenders
Argentine expatriate footballers
Argentine footballers
Sportivo Desamparados footballers
Persija Jakarta players
MISC-MIFA players
Cibao FC players
Torneo Argentino A players
Torneo Argentino B players
Liga 1 (Indonesia) players
Argentine expatriate sportspeople in Indonesia
Argentine expatriate sportspeople in Malaysia
Expatriate footballers in Indonesia
Expatriate footballers in Malaysia
Expatriate footballers in the Dominican Republic